The Forschungsinstitut für Philosophie Hannover is a research institute in Hanover, Germany. Its field of activity is philosophy. It is sponsored by the Roman Catholic Diocese of Hildesheim. It was founded by Josef Homeyer in 1988, and its first director was Peter Koslowski. The current director is Jürgen Manemann. Vittorio Hösle is an example of the philosophers who have been active at the institute, and research fellows are also accepted.

The institute deals with philosophical questions concerning democracy and human society, further fields are economic anthropology and environmental ethics. Questions of medical ethics and humanism are addressed as well.

The institute publishes its research results via a biannual journal, a blog, as well as philosophical volumes and monographs.

References

External links
 Official website
Forschungsinstitut für Philosophie Hannover (FIPH)
FIPH - Forschungsinstitut für Philosophie Hannover

Hanover
Organisations based in Lower Saxony
Roman Catholic Diocese of Hildesheim
Philosophy institutes
Research institutes established in 1988
Research institutes in Germany